Brasilotyphlus braziliensis is a species of amphibian in the family Siphonopidae. It was considered monotypic within Brasilotyphlus but a recently described species (Brasilotyphlus guarantanus) has been placed in this same genus. It is endemic to Brazil. Its habitat includes natural forests, dry tropical or subtropical. It is in danger of extinction because of the loss of its natural habitat.

References

braziliensis
Amphibians described in 1945
Endemic fauna of Brazil
Amphibians of Brazil